Antonio Menegazzo (13 September 1931 – 20 March 2019) was an Italian Roman Catholic titular bishop.

Biography 
Menegazzo was born in Italy and was ordained to the priesthood in 1956. He served as titular bishop of Mesarfelta and was the apostolic administrator of the Roman Catholic Diocese of El Obeid, Sudan from 1996 until 2010.

Notes

1931 births
2019 deaths
Italian Roman Catholic bishops in Africa
Roman Catholic bishops of El Obeid